Julienne Irwin (born March 14, 1993) is an American singer from Bel Air, Maryland. Irwin was a finalist on the second season of America's Got Talent.

Biography
Prior to her America's Got Talent debut, Irwin has stated she has never performed publicly or received any vocal lessons. According to her bio on the NBC website, Irwin attended Harford Christian School where she was a cheerleader and became the class president. She is also said to want to sing the national anthem at Camden Yards, the home of the Baltimore Orioles.

Irwin is a very devoted country music fan. In her own words, on her public website, she states:
I live for country music. If it didn't exist, a huge piece of my life would be missing. It wakes me up in the morning and puts me to sleep at night, and it's on my mind 24 hours a day.

She also values her education:
School is such an integral part of my life. I really think it has molded me into who I am today.

2007: America's Got Talent
As in the previous year, the show consisted of a nationwide search, through thousands of applicants all competing for the top one million dollar prize.

Irwin first auditioned in New York, with an a cappella rendition of "How Do I Live" (LeAnn Rimes) by Diane Warren.  The judges unanimously praised her raw talent and invited her to the Las Vegas callbacks.

In subsequent shows, Irwin performed individual songs and passed through to the next round as follows:

 Las Vegas Callbacks:  "At Last" (Etta James) by Mack Gordon and Harry Warren.  (Only shown briefly in a montage.)
 Semifinals:  "Bless the Broken Road" (Rascal Flatts) by Bobby Boyd, Jeff Hanna and Marcus Hummon.
 Top Ten: "Til I Can Make It On My Own", by Tammy Wynette, George Richey and Billy Sherill.
 The Final Eight: "Crazy" (Patsy Cline) by Willie Nelson.

She became one of the top four finalists, and on August 14, performed "What Hurts the Most" (Rascal Flatts) by Jeffrey Steele and Steve Robson, as the judges' pick for her, and "Over The Rainbow" by Harold Arlen and E.Y. Harburg, as her choice. After the song, judge Piers Morgan said:
.Julienne, I still don't think you've done enough to win, but I've gotta say, that was a brilliant performance.  And I think if America gives votes for people that make me look stupid, you're going to get lots of votes.
 

The "Season Finale" was about entertainment, performance reviews and announcement of results.  Irwin performed "Teardrops on My Guitar" with the famous country singer-songwriter Taylor Swift.  After the song, Swift was asked, based on her experience as a teenage Country Music singer, what advice she would offer to Irwin.  In reply, Swift commented:
... She [Irwin] has such an adorable personality, and that's so much of the battle right there.  You know, being so endearing and so so humble.  I think she should just stay who she is.  I think she's got it.
 

Afterward, a prerecorded message was played from four-time CMA and three-time ACM Female Vocalist of the Year winner, Martina McBride.  In it she said:
I just want to take this chance to let you know that I'm really impressed with your [Irwin's] singing.  You have a great voice. It's wonderful to watch you. As a matter of fact, watching you brings back a lot of memories of myself singing when I was your age...
  

It was later announced that Irwin was the first contestant eliminated of the final four.

Career
On September 9, 2007, Julienne Irwin got to live her dream of singing the national anthem at Camden Yards, as reported in the September 10, 2007 issue of the Baltimore Sun.  In the words of Sun reporter, John-John Williams IV:
Before she performed, the Bel Air resident showed signs of a typical awe-struck teenager. Her jaw dropped after a brief conversation with Orioles starter Melvin Mora.

"Oh my gosh!" she mouthed to her father, Felix "Phil" Irwin.

When it was time to perform, Julienne displayed the poise and maturity that captured fans this summer. The words of the anthem flowed with the clarity and strength of a professional. Julienne later said she was a bundle of nerves inside.

The story goes on to say that Julienne is settling into life as a student. She began her freshman year at Harford Christian School in Darlington earlier that week.

On September 23, 2007, Julienne Irwin's singing once again brought her to the national stage.  She was invited to sing the national anthem to a crowd of 140,000 spectators at the Dodge Dealers 400, at Dover International Speedway, as televised on ABC to a nationwide audience.

Irwin announced on her MySpace that she was going to tour with Kenny Rogers in December 2007. She finished the tour on December 23, 2007 and has written on her MySpace that she is extremely grateful to Kenny Rogers for giving her that opportunity. Irwin has traveled across the country from her hometown in Maryland performing her original music and opening for performers such as Tracy Lawrence, Ronnie Dunn, and Uncle Kracker.

On May 27, 2008, Irwin announced on her MySpace blog that in March, she went into a recording studio to produce video demos:
A little over two months ago, for my 15th birthday, I went into the recording studio (for the first time ever!!!) to record some demos. Four of which were new songs, written for me, and the final two were a full version of "Somewhere Over the Rainbow" and "Fields of Gold".

Recently, the songs recorded in the demo session were made available for viewing on the Internet.

Julienne graduated from Bel Air High School in Bel Air, Maryland and is an alumna of Belmont University in Nashville, Tennessee class of 2015. In 2010, she worked with noted Nashville producer, David Malloy and is continuing her goal of song-writing. Her new website www.julienneirwin.com has become more interactive and fan-friendly with the addition of a blog. Julienne can also be found on Facebook and Twitter.

References

External links

Julienne Irwin Video Song Demo Site

1993 births
America's Got Talent contestants
American child singers
American country singer-songwriters
American women country singers
Singer-songwriters from Maryland
Child pop musicians
Country musicians from Maryland
Living people
People from Bel Air, Maryland
American women pop singers
21st-century American women singers
21st-century American singers